Matvey Natanzon (better known by his pseudonym Falafel) (July 5, 1968 - February 14, 2020) was a Russian-born Israeli backgammon player.

Life and career
Natanzon was born in Soviet Russia and moved with his mother to Azor, a small Israeli town near Tel Aviv, in 1972.  He moved to Buffalo, New York, as a teenager.  Natanzon graduated from the New York State University at Buffalo in 1991 with a degree in accounting.  Shortly thereafter he moved to Manhattan.  Homeless, he lived for 6 months in Washington Square Park and learned to hustle chess and backgammon from local gamblers.  Some of Natanzon's associates at that time went on to become famous poker players, including Phil Laak, Gus Hansen, and Abe Mosseri.  Natanzon himself played poker and was part owner of a card parlor in Tel Aviv.

In 2005 Natanzon played on the Israeli team in the Nations Cup backgammon tournament.

In 2007, Natanzon was named the number one backgammon player in the world by an unscientifically compiled peer-audited review known as Giants of Backgammon.  Although the rankings are not precise, Jake Jacobs, the list's compiler, says about it that "We can never know for certain who is the best player in a given year, but we can confidently eliminate 99.99 per cent.  Falafel survived the cut."

Natanzon died on February 14, 2020.

References

American backgammon players
Soviet emigrants to Israel
Israeli emigrants to the United States
Israeli people of Russian-Jewish descent
American people of Russian-Jewish descent
Jewish American sportspeople
Place of death missing
Sportspeople from Buffalo, New York
University at Buffalo alumni
1968 births
2020 deaths
21st-century American Jews